The Postmasters General of Ireland, held by two people simultaneously, was a new appointment set up as part of the establishment of the Irish Post Office independent from that of Great Britain, by the Act 23, 24 George III in 1784. The post lasted nearly fifty years. The act was not repealed upon the Act of Union in 1800 but in 1831.

Act 23, 24 George III

History
While both the post offices of England and Ireland had two postmasters general, in Ireland the assent of only one was required for decisions as opposed to the assent of both being necessary in England. Besides confirming the monopoly for carrying letters in Ireland and giving the right to establish a four-mile limit penny post in Dublin, one of the postmasters general's duties was to measure the post roads in Ireland. During the time the postmasters general of Ireland existed profits in the Irish office increased from £15,000 in 1786 to £108,000 in 1831.

Most of the postmasters were habitual absentees except for Richard Trench, 2nd Earl of Clancarty, who, concerned by the out-dated postal system in Ireland, sent Edward Lees, Secretary of the Irish Post Office, to London to study their modern methods of operations.

When the foundation-stone for the new General Post Office in Dublin was laid by the Lord Lieutenant of Ireland, Charles Whitworth, 1st Earl Whitworth, on 12 August 1814, the ceremony was attended by the incumbent Postmasters General, Charles O'Neill, 1st Earl O'Neill and Laurence Parsons, 2nd Earl of Rosse.

Termination
Curiously, the act establishing the independent Irish Post Office was not repealed upon the Act of Union in 1800, so the post continued until 6 April 1831, when the offices of Postmasters General of Ireland was abolished and consolidated into the existing single post of the Postmaster General of the United Kingdom with appointments of all officers for the Dublin office being made in London, per Act 1 William, cap 18.

See also
 J. J. Walsh: Postmaster General of the Irish Free State
 Minister for Posts and Telegraphs

References
Notes

Sources
 
 

Great Britain Acts of Parliament 1784
Postal system of the United Kingdom
1784 establishments in Ireland
1830s disestablishments in Ireland
Ireland